The Scottish Open is a darts tournament organised by the Scottish Darts Association and has been staged every year in February in 1983 and since 1995. The current venue is the Normandy Cosmopolitan Hotel in Renfrew. In 2014 Robbie Green became the first player to win the tournament on more than one occasion, with the previous 20 tournaments won by 20 different players, Wesley Harms has since achieved this feat. In the Ladies Deta Hedman has won the event 7 times including 2023.  

Entries for this event used to be around 1,300 men around the early 2010s. With different factors at play this has been reduced to around 500. 

The British Darts Organisation created two new events (the England Open and the Scottish Open) in 1995, which could have been in response to the split in darts which had seen many of the top players leave the organisation to start the WDC (now the PDC).

List of tournaments

Men's

Women's

Tournament records Men
 Most wins 2:  Robbie Green,  Wesley Harms. 
 Most finals 3:  Robbie Green,  Tony Eccles. 
 Most semi-finals 4:  Martin Adams,  Ronnie Baxter
 Most quarter-finals 4:  Gary Robson.
 Most appearances 7:  Gary Robson,  Martin Adams. 
 Most prize money won £6,470:  Robbie Green. 
 Best winning average (114.00) :  Martin Adams v  Gary Anderson, 2005 Final.
 Youngest winner age 23:   Russell Stewart. 
 Oldest winner age 48:  Martin Adams.

Tournament records Ladies

 Most wins 7: Deta Hedman
 Most finals 9: Deta Hedman
 Most Losing finals 5: Fallon Sherrock
 Youngest winner age 17:  Beau Greaves
 Oldest winner age 63:  Deta Hedman.

References

External links
 Scottish Open Winners dartsdatabase

1995 establishments in Scotland
Darts tournaments
British Darts Organisation tournaments
Darts in Scotland